Simon Mawer (born 1948, England) is a British author who lives in Italy.

Life and work
Born in 1948 and was educated at Millfield School in Somerset and at Brasenose College, Oxford, Mawer took a degree in Zoology and has worked as a biology teacher for most of his life. He published his first novel, Chimera, (Hamish Hamilton, 1989) at the comparatively late age of forty-one. It won the McKitterick Prize for a first novel by an author over the age of forty. Mendel's Dwarf followed three works of modest success and established him as a writer of note on both sides of the Atlantic. The New York Times described it as a "thematically ambitious and witty novel". Uzo optioned film rights, and then later Barbra Streisand optioned them.

The novels The Gospel of Judas and The Fall came next, followed by Swimming to Ithaca, a novel partially inspired by his childhood on the island of Cyprus. The non-fiction A Place in Italy (1992), written in the wake of A year in Provence, followed and recounts the first two years in the Italian village where he lived. He then published another non-fiction book, Gregor Mendel: Planting the Seeds of Genetics, published in conjunction with the Field Museum of Chicago as a companion volume to the museum's concurrent exhibition of the same name.

In 2009, Mawer published The Glass Room, a novel about a modernist villa built in a Czech city. His 2012 book The Girl Who Fell from the Sky was received positively on both sides of the Atlantic, described as "a professionally crafted and engaging story"  and a "skillfully and intelligently executed thriller". In 2015 he published Tightrope, a follow-on novel from The Girl Who Fell from the Sky.  Tightrope has been described as "...skillful and evocative examination of a mind under stress. Most recently, he wrote Prague Spring (2018) about Brits living in and travelling through Czechoslovakia during both the Prague Spring and subsequent Warsaw Pact invasion.

Personal life
Mawer has lived in Rome since 1977, teaching biology at St. George's British International School in Rome. He is married and has two children.

Bibliography
 Chimera (1989)
 A Place in Italy (1992) (Nonfiction)
 The Bitter Cross (1992)
 A Jealous God (1996)
 Mendel's Dwarf (1997)
 The Gospel of Judas (2000)
 The Fall (2003)
 Swimming to Ithaca (2006)
 Gregor Mendel: Planting the Seeds of Genetics (2006) (Nonfiction)
 The Glass Room (2009)
 The Girl Who Fell from the Sky, published in the United States by Other Press as Trapeze (2012)
 Tightrope (2015)
 Prague Spring (2018)
 Ancestry (2022)

Awards and honors
1990 McKitterick Prize for first novels, Chimera
2003 Boardman Tasker Prize for Mountain Literature, The Fall
2003 Man Booker Prize, longlist, The Fall
2009 Man Booker Prize, shortlist, The Glass Room
2010 Walter Scott Prize, shortlist, The Glass Room
2016 Walter Scott Prize, winner, Tightrope

References

External links

 Official site

Living people
1948 births
Boardman Tasker Prize winners
20th-century British novelists
21st-century British novelists
British science writers
People educated at Millfield
Alumni of Brasenose College, Oxford
British male novelists
20th-century British male writers
21st-century British male writers
Walter Scott Prize winners